The Samsung Galaxy Tab S2 8.0 is an Android-based tablet computer produced and marketed by Samsung Electronics. Belonging to the high-end "S" line, it was announced on 20 July 2015 and was released in September 2015 along with the Samsung Galaxy Tab S2 9.7. It is available in Wi-Fi only and  Wi-Fi/4G LTE variants.

History 
The Galaxy Tab S2 8.0 was announced on  July 20, 2015 from a Samsung press release.

The computer tablet was released on September 3, 2015 at $399.

A refreshed model series was released in late 2016 (UK early 2017),(Tab S2 VE, SM-T710/715/719) replacing the older Exynos 5433 SoC with an newer Snapdragon 652 SoC. Besides some minor software changes and Android 7.x, it is mostly the same as the previous model.

Features
The device currently runs Android 5.1.1 Lollipop with the TouchWiz software suite. The Galaxy Tab S2 8.0 is available in WiFi-only and 4G/LTE & WiFi variants. Storage ranges from 32 GB to 64 GB depending on the model, with a microSDXC card slot for expansion up to 128 GB. The display is a Super AMOLED (4:3) screen with a resolution of 2048x1536 pixels. It also features a 2.1 MP front-facing camera and an 8.0 MP AF rear-facing camera without LED flash. It also has the ability to record HD videos. The hardware home button serves as the fingerprint sensor.

The Galaxy Tab S2 8.0 takes design cues from the 2015 Samsung Galaxy A series phones because the device has a painted metal frame with chamfered edges and a plastic back, along with a camera design similar to the Galaxy S6. It is available in black, white, or gold/beige colors. At 5.6mm thick, the Tab S2 8.0 is, as of September 2015, the world's thinnest tablet together with the bigger screen Samsung Galaxy Tab S2 9.7.

See also
Comparison of tablet computers
Samsung Galaxy Tab series
Samsung Galaxy S series
Samsung Galaxy A series

References

External links
 

Samsung Galaxy Tab series
Android (operating system) devices
Tablet computers introduced in 2015
Tablet computers